Johnstown is an unincorporated community in Cumberland County, Illinois, United States. In which is also the oldest settlement in Cumberland County, Illinois.

References

Unincorporated communities in Cumberland County, Illinois
Unincorporated communities in Illinois